Benjamin Rosenbaum (born August 23, 1969) is an American science fiction, fantasy, and literary fiction writer and computer programmer, whose stories have been finalists for the Hugo Award, the Nebula Award, the Theodore Sturgeon Award, the BSFA award, and the World Fantasy Award.

Career
Born in New York City but raised in Arlington, Virginia, Rosenbaum received degrees in computer science and religious studies from Brown University.

His past software development positions include designing software for the National Science Foundation, designing software for the D.C. city government, and being one of the founders of Digital Addiction (which created the online game Sanctum).

His first professionally published story appeared in 2001. His work has been published in The Magazine of Fantasy & Science Fiction, Asimov's Science Fiction, Harper's, Nature, and McSweeney's Quarterly Concern. It has also appeared on the websites Strange Horizons and Infinite Matrix, and in various year's best anthologies. The Ant King and Other Stories, a collection of Rosenbaum's short fiction, was published by Small Beer Press.

His first novel was published by Piper Verlag in German under the title Die Auflösung in May 2018. It will be published in English in May 2021 by Liz Gorinsky's Erewhon Books as The Unraveling.

Personal life
Rosenbaum formerly lived in Washington, DC, with his wife Esther and children Aviva and Noah. He currently lives near Basel, Switzerland.

Selected stories
"True Names" (2008) (online), collaboration with Cory Doctorow, was nominated for a Hugo Award.
"Anthroptic" (2007) (online) collaboration with visual artist Ethan Ham
"A Siege of Cranes"(2006) (online) was nominated for a World Fantasy Award.
"Embracing-the-New" (2004) (online) was nominated for Nebula Award for Best Short Story.
"Biographical Notes to 'A Discourse on the Nature of Causality, with Air-Planes', by Benjamin Rosenbaum" (2004) (online) was nominated for the Hugo Award for Best Novelette.
"Start the Clock" (2004) (online), was written for the book project Exquisite Corpuscle, where each contributor produced something inspired by the previous contributor's piece (they weren't shown the preceding pieces). It was nominated for a Theodore Sturgeon Award.
"The House Beyond Your Sky"(2006) (online) was nominated for a BSFA Award and a Hugo Award.

He released all seven stories under Creative Commons licenses, in the latter three cases allowing others to modify the work.

References

External links
Benjamin Rosenbaum's Page, the author's official site. Includes his blog, bibliography, and the texts of a number of his stories.
Interview excerpt from the October 2005 issue of Locus magazine.

1969 births
American fantasy writers
American science fiction writers
American short story writers
Magic realism writers
Postmodern writers
Living people
Brown University alumni
Jewish American writers
American male short story writers
American male novelists
Creative Commons-licensed authors
American expatriates in Switzerland
21st-century American Jews